Kipa is a supermarket chain in Turkey, owned by Migros Türk since 2017. It was previously owned by the largest UK retailer, Tesco. The original company, Kitle Pazarlama A.Ş., was founded in August 1992 and opened its first Kipa store in November 1994. 

Tesco purchased a controlling interest in Kipa in 2003. In September 2010, Tesco Extra began its operation in Turkey. As of January 2013, it had 513 stores, with plans for continued strong growth. Kipa used the standard Tesco retailing model, which meant that it still ran Tesco supermarkets, including a range of store sizes from hypermarkets to Tesco Express outlets. 

In June 2016, Tesco announced it would sell Kipa to competitor Migros Türk. The sale was completed in February 2017.

References

External links 
  (in Turkish)
 CEO's presentation (February 2011)

1992 establishments in Turkey
Supermarkets of Turkey
Tesco